Passapatanzy is an unincorporated community and census-designated place (CDP) in King George County, Virginia, United States. The population as of the 2010 census was 1,283.

History
It was recorded as a Patawomeck village ruled by Japazaws, elder brother of the weroance. He conspired with the English adventurer and sea captain, Samuel Argall, who planned to capture Chief Powhatan's daughter, Pocahontas on April 13, 1613 to use as a hostage in English negotiations with Powhatan. They wanted captives and property returned.

According to Mattaponi and Patawomeck tradition, Pocahontas was residing there with her husband, Kocoum. Their daughter, Ka-Okee, survived, cared for by other Patawomeck people after Kocoum's death. A historic marker about this incident stands near the Potomac Creek Bridge on U.S. Route 1 in Stafford.

Geography
Passapatanzy is in western King George County, along Virginia State Route 218, which leads west  to Fredericksburg and east  to U.S. Route 301 at Dahlgren.

References

Unincorporated communities in King George County, Virginia
Census-designated places in Virginia
Census-designated places in King George County, Virginia